Andrian Raturandang (born 29 July 1976) is an Indonesian former professional tennis player. He was a gold medalist for Indonesia at the 1997 Southeast Asian Games.

Raturandang reached a career high singles ranking of 484 while competing on the professional tour, mostly in satellite and Futures events. He made one ATP Tour singles main draw, as a wildcard at the 1996 Indonesia Open, where he was beaten in the first round by Chris Wilkinson. He also featured twice in the doubles main draw of the Indonesia Open.

A five-time Southeast Asian Games medalist, Raturandang represented Indonesia in 10 Davis Cup ties, between 1996 and 1998 and then in 2001. From his 19 singles rubbers he won only two of them, against Tsai Chia-yen of Chinese Taipei and Sean Karam of Lebanon.

See also
List of Indonesia Davis Cup team representatives

References

External links
 
 
 

1976 births
Living people
Indonesian male tennis players
Southeast Asian Games medalists in tennis
Southeast Asian Games gold medalists for Indonesia
Southeast Asian Games bronze medalists for Indonesia
Competitors at the 1993 Southeast Asian Games
Competitors at the 1997 Southeast Asian Games
20th-century Indonesian people
21st-century Indonesian people